The women's 60 metres hurdles event  at the 1989 IAAF World Indoor Championships was held at the Budapest Sportcsarnok in Budapest on 5 March.

Medalists

Results

Heats
First 2 of each heat (Q) and next 2 fastest (q) qualified for the final.

Final

References

60
60 metres hurdles at the World Athletics Indoor Championships